The 2005 Russian Figure Skating Championships took place in Saint Petersburg from January 5 to 8, 2005. Skaters competed in the disciplines of men's singles, ladies' singles, pair skating, and ice dancing. The results were one of the criteria used to pick the Russian teams to the 2005 World Championships and the 2005 European Championships.

Senior results

Men

Ladies

Pairs

Ice dancing

External links
 2005 Russian Championships

2004 in figure skating
Russian Figure Skating Championships, 2005
Figure skating
Russian Figure Skating Championships